Kazimierz Sylwester Paździor (4 March 1935 – 24 June 2010) was a Polish amateur lightweight boxer. He won the European title in 1957, the Polish title in 1958 and 1960, and an Olympic gold medal in 1960. He retired in 1961 with a record of 179 wins, 3 draws and 12 losses.

Paździor worked as an economist at a metal plant in his home town of Radom. After retiring from competitions he remained active in boxing as a coach. In 1990 he received the Aleksander Reksza Boxing Award.

References

1935 births
2010 deaths
Lightweight boxers
Olympic boxers of Poland
Boxers at the 1960 Summer Olympics
Olympic gold medalists for Poland
People from Radom
Olympic medalists in boxing
Medalists at the 1960 Summer Olympics
Sportspeople from Masovian Voivodeship
Polish male boxers
21st-century Polish people
20th-century Polish people